Jovane Eduardo Borges Cabral (born 14 June 1998) is a Cape Verdean professional footballer who plays as a winger for Primeira Liga club Sporting CP and the Cape Verde national team.

Club career
Born in Assomada, Sotavento Islands, Cabral joined Sporting CP's youth academy at the age of 16 from Grémio Nhagar. On 20 August 2016 he made his senior debut with the reserve side, coming on as a 61st-minute substitute in a 2–4 home loss against Fafe in the LigaPro. His first goal in the competition came on 19 March 2017, netting through a free kick in a 2–1 away victory over Leixões. Still that year, he helped the juniors win the national championship.

Cabral was called by first-team manager Jorge Jesus for the 2017 pre-season, but eventually returned to the B team. He made his competitive debut for the former on 12 October, replacing Mattheus Oliveira for the final 12 minutes of the 4–2 victory at Oleiros in the third round of the Taça de Portugal. 

Cabral scored his first official goal for Sporting on 1 September 2018, his 88th-minute strike earning the hosts a 1–0 Primeira Liga home win against Feirense. On 3 December, in what was new manager Marcel Keizer's first match in charge, he netted through a 20-meter curl to close the score in a 3–1 defeat of Rio Ave at the Estádio dos Arcos; the goal was later named as the best of the season at the annual awards ceremony.

In June 2020, after the season resumed following the COVID-19 shutdown, Cabral scored four goals over three consecutive games. This concluded with two in a 3–1 win at Belenenses SAD on 26 June, when he was replaced injured at half-time; he was named the league's Player of the Month.

On 19 January 2021, after having replaced fellow youth graduate Tiago Tomás late into the second half, Cabral scored twice to help his team come from behind and beat Porto 2–1 in the semi-finals of the Taça da Liga. One year later, he was loaned to Italian Serie A club Lazio with an option to buy. He made his debut for the latter on 17 February, playing ten minutes in the 2–1 away loss against Porto in the knockout play-offs of the UEFA Europa League. He totalled four games for the club from Rome, scoring in a 3–3 home draw with Verona on 21 May in the last fixture of the campaign.

Cabral was supposed to join Real Valladolid on loan in the January 2023 transfer window, but the deal fell through due to bureaucratic reasons.

International career
Cabral won his first cap for Cape Verde on 28 March 2017, in a 2–0 friendly win over Luxembourg. However, in October 2018 he announced he was applying for Portuguese nationality and that he intended to represent its national team.

On 23 March 2022, five years after his debut, Cabral scored his first goal, in the 2–0 friendly defeat of Guadeloupe in Orléans, France.

Career statistics

Club

International

Scores and results list Cape Verde's goal tally first, score column indicates score after each Cabral goal.

Honours
Sporting CP
Primeira Liga: 2020–21
Taça de Portugal: 2018–19
Taça da Liga: 2018–19, 2020–21, 2021–22
Supertaça Cândido de Oliveira: 2021

Individual
Primeira Liga Goal of the Season: 2018–19

References

External links

1998 births
Living people
People from Santa Catarina, Cape Verde
Cape Verdean footballers
Footballers from Santiago, Cape Verde
Association football wingers
Grémio Nhagar players
Primeira Liga players
Liga Portugal 2 players
Sporting CP B players
Sporting CP footballers
Serie A players
S.S. Lazio players
Cape Verde international footballers
Cape Verdean expatriate footballers
Expatriate footballers in Portugal
Expatriate footballers in Italy
Cape Verdean expatriate sportspeople in Portugal
Cape Verdean expatriate sportspeople in Italy